Shandao (613–681) was an influential writer for the Pure Land Buddhism, prominent in China, Korea, Vietnam and Japan. His writings had a strong influence on later Pure Land masters including Hōnen and Shinran in Japan. The Samguk yusa records him among the 3 monks who first brought Buddhist teaching, or Dharma, to Korea: Malananta (late 4th century) Indian Buddhist monk who brought Buddhism to Baekje in the southern Korean peninsula, Shandao (also spelled Sundo) monk who brought Buddhism to Goguryeo in northern Korea and Ado monk who brought Buddhism to Silla in central Korea. Buddhism,  a religion originating in what is now India, was transmitted to Korea via China in the late 4th century. In Jōdo Shinshū, he is considered the Fifth Patriarch.

Biography
Shandao was born in what is now present Zhucheng. When he was young, he entered the priesthood and devoted himself to the study of the Infinite Life and Vimalakirti Sutras. One day, in the year 641, he visited the temple of the famous Pure Land master Daochao, who happened to be giving a lecture on the Amitāyurdhyāna Sūtra. This lecture ultimately inspired him to follow and then spread Pure Land Buddhism.

Shandao dwelt at Xiangji Temple in Shaanxi, which continues to honor his memory and contributions.  In his lifetime, Shandao wrote five major works on Pure Land Buddhism, with his commentaries on the Amitāyurdhyāna Sūtra being among the most influential.

Teachings
Shandao was recorded as having taught various Pure Land practices, including nianfo, as well as written several commentaries on extant Mahayana scriptures. For instance, Shandao was noted to be a practitioner who engaged in the austere practices of never lying down to sleep and constantly practicing samādhi and ritual activity, and he is said to have advised other people to do the same.

The Three Minds and Four Modes of Practice 
Among Shandao's teachings are the Three Minds and Four Modes of Practice for Pure Land Buddhism.  In the Commentaries, sincere devotion to Amitābha over the long-term leads to three minds, or states of mind:

 The Utterly Sincere Mind
 The Profound, or Deeply Believing, Mind
 The Mind which dedicates one's merit (or good works) toward rebirth in the Pure Land.

In Hymns in Praise of Birth (Wang-sheng-li-tsan), Shandao taught the Four Modes of Practice that develop through devotion to Amitābha:
 Reverence shown to Amitābha and bodhisattvas in Sukhavati: Avalokiteśvara and Mahasthamaprapta. 
 Wholehearted and exclusive practice of reciting Amitābha's name.
 Uninterrupted, as in routine, practice.
 Long-term practice.

Meditative and Ritual Practices 
Shandao emphasised meditative and ritual practices in addition to nianfo/nembutsu. Shandao's tract, "The Meritorious Dharma Gate of the Samādhi Involving Contemplation of the Ocean-like Marks of the Buddha Amitābha" (Chinese: 阿彌陀佛相海三昧功德法門; Pinyin: Ēmítuófó xiāng hǎi sānmèi gōngdé fǎmén) emphasizes samādhi and ritual practice. Also, Shandao's direct disciples, such as Huaigan, were recorded as having emphasized meditation practices. In addition, Shandao's expositions on the Pure Land are also rooted in Madhyamika and Yogacara principles.

The Difficulty of Attaining Rebirth 
Shandao's tract, the "Correct Mindfulness for Rebirth at the Moment of Death" (Chinese: 臨終往生正念文; Pinyin: Línzhōng wǎngshēng zhèngniàn wén), presents a nuanced understanding of the rebirth process and details many dangers that he believed could hinder the dying aspirant’s rebirth in the Pure Land. In another tract, "The Meritorious Dharma Gate of the Samādhi Involving Contemplation of the Ocean-like Marks of the Buddha Amitābha" (Chinese: 阿彌陀佛相海三昧功德法門; Pinyin: Ēmítuófó xiāng hǎi sānmèi gōngdé fǎmén) Shandao describes a specific set of ritual protocols and practices for helping dying Buddhist devotees achieve successful deliverance from “evil destinies” and procure successful rebirth in the Pure Land. Other similar hagiographical records from Shandao  reflect concerns regarding more complicated requirements for rebirth in the Pure Land, including but not limited to recitation of Amitābha's name on one's deathbed specifically. Charles Jones also shows how Shandao conceived of it to be possible for one to fail to be born "at the final moment ... if impure persons defiled the irtual space and allowed demonic beings to invade."

At the same time, Shandao and his disciple Huaigan emphasised that all ordinary beings, no matter their level of attainment, are capable of birth by the power of the Buddha's vows, and that "even the worst evil-doer could say the name of the Buddha and gain immediate access to a glittering Pure Land immediately after death." In particular that utterance is interpreted by Shandao as calling "Amitābha Buddha for seven days or even for one day for as little as ten oral invocations or even one oral calling or one contemplation," and that birth in the Pure Land was not for superior practitioners, but for the lowest kinds of people who have performed "unwholesome acts: the Five Heinous Deeds, the ten evils, and everything that is not good."

Role in Japanese Traditions 
In Japanese Pure Land traditions, such as Jōdo-shū and Jōdo Shinshū, Shandao is traditionally seen as having advocated for the exclusivity of the nianfo/nembutsu as a practice in order to seek salvation through Amitābha, meaning that reciting the name of Amitābha Buddha was all that was needed. Writers such as Julian Pas have suggested that these traditional narratives surrounding Shandao were misleading, and that rather he wrote extensive commentaries to scriptures regarding complex samādhi practices such as visualization and meditation, showing that he promoted different practices and methods. On the other hand, defenders of the Japanese approach, such as Jérôme Ducor, have suggested that writers such as Pas have misrepresented the relevant Japanese sources, and that Shandao's scheme clearly delineates between "meditation sūtras" such as the Pratyutpanna Sūtra from sūtras that teach "birth in the Pure Land," among which are included the Infinite Life Sūtra, the Amitābha Sūtra, and the Amitāyurdhyāna Sūtra. Ducor also notes how Shandao's Commentary on the Amitāyurdhyāna Sūtra makes clear the distinction between birth in the Pure Land by faith and nianfo/nembutsu, which he regards as definitive and a "non-requested" teaching, from the meditative practices such as visualisation, which he regards as a skilful means and a teaching given only on request by Queen Vaidehī.

Works 
Shandao's extant works include:

 The Commentary on the Contemplation Sūtra (Chinese: 觀無量壽經疏; Pinyin: Guān wúliàngshòu jīng shū; Hepburn: Kanmuryōju kyō sho). Taishō no. 1753, in four fascicles.
 English translations: Peter Lunde Johnson (2020), The Land of Pure Bliss, On the Nature of Faith & Practice in Greater Vehicle (Mahāyāna) Buddhism.
 The Dharma Gate of the Merits of the Ocean-like Samādhi of the Contemplation of the Marks of Amitābha Buddha (Chinese: 觀念阿彌陀佛相海三昧功德法門; Pinyin: Guānniàn āmítuó fó xiāng hǎisānmèi gōngdé fǎmén; Hepburn: Kannen amida butsu sō kai sammai kudoku hōmen). Taishō no. 1959, in one fascicle.
 Praise of Dharma Services (Chinese: 法事讚; Pinyin: Fǎshì Zàn; Hepburn: Hōji San). Taishō no. 1979, in two fascicles.
 Verses in Praise for Rebirth in the Pure Land (Chinese: 往生禮讚偈; Pinyin: Wǎngshēng lǐ zànjié; Hepburn: Ōjō rai sange). Taishō no. 1980, in one fascicle.
 English translation: Zuio Hisao Inagaki (2002), Liturgy for Birth. Online Version. Print version: (2009) Shan-dao's Liturgy for Birth: Ōjōraisan. Annotated Translation by Hisao Inagaki. Edited by Doyi Tan.
 Praise of Pratyutpanna (Chinese: 般舟讚; Pinyin: Pánzhōu Zàn; Hepburn: Hanjū San). Taishō no. 1981, in one fascicle.

See also
 Buddhism in China
 Buddhism in Korea
 Buddhism in Japan
 Hinduism in Korea
 Indians in Korea
 Koreans in India
 Memorial of Heo Hwang-ok, Ayodhya
 India–South Korea relations
 India – North Korea relations

References

Bibliography
 Inagaki, Hisao, trans. (1999). Shan-tao's Exposition of the Method of Contemplation on Amida Buddha, part 1, Pacific World, Third Series, Number 1, 77–89.
 Inagaki, Hisao, trans. (2000). Shan-tao's Exposition of the Method of Contemplation on Amida Buddha, part 2, Pacific World, Third Series, Number 2, 207–228. 
 Inagaki, Hisao, trans. (2001). Shan-tao's Exposition of the Method of Contemplation on Amida Buddha, part 3, Pacific World, Third Series, Number 3, 277–288.
 Pas, Julian F. (1995). Visions of Sukhavati: Shan-Tao's Commentary on the Kuan Wu-liang- Shou-Fo Ching. Albany, State University of New York Press,  
 Johnson, Peter, trans. (2020). The Land of Pure Bliss, On the Nature of Faith & Practice in Greater Vehicle (Mahāyāna) Buddhism, Including a Full Translation of Shàndǎo's Commentary Explaining The Scripture About Meditation on the Buddha ‘Of Infinite Life’ (Amitāyur Buddha Dhyāna Sūtra, 觀無量壽佛經) , An Lac Publications

External links
 Inagaki, Hisao: Biography of Shan-Tao A comprehensive look at Shan-Tao's life

Tang dynasty Buddhist monks
Pure Land Buddhists
613 births
681 deaths
People from Zibo
Jōdo Shin patriarchs